David Kinkade (born August 25, 1983) is an American metal drummer.

History 
David Kinkade was born in New Jersey in 1983. At the age of three, he started picking up drums after his grandfather gave him his first drum kit.

He has become known for his hard hitting, fast drum fills and double bass.

His influences include bands such as Metallica, Slayer, Pantera, Pink Floyd, Kiss, Iron Maiden, Sepultura, Immortal, Emperor and Devin Townsend Project. His drumming influences include Lars Ulrich, Dave Lombardo, Simon Philips, Gavin Harrison, Vinnie Paul, Nick Barker, Gene Hoglan, Hellhammer, Nick Mason and of course Neil Peart.

In August 2011, he was announced as the drummer of Soulfly, replacing Joe Nunez.

In October 2011, he parted ways with Borknagar.

In October 2012, he announced his retirement from music, leaving Soulfly after their show in Bangkok. He retired in order to focus on his family.

In 2020, Kinkade decided to return to creating music with his own band, Monarch. On his social media, he stated- "I felt as if I was just wasting my life by not making music. I'm older now, I have a child, a career. Everything is essentially great to the eye but I've sincerely missed doing what I do best- playing music. By resurrecting my own personal project that I started 20 years ago, I'm finally making it happen on my own terms and under my own rules. My back is fixed and I'm playing better than I ever have. Here we come."

Monarch independently released (digitally through Bloodblast Distribution) debut album "All The World's Pain" in February 2021.

In February 2022, Kinkade announced that his former Soulfly bandmates, Marc Rizzo and Tony Campos will join him on the next Monarch album, due in late 2022.

Personal 

Aside from his drumming career, Kinkade is known for his interest in animal welfare. In 2007, he started a foundation called the "Metal 4 Pets Foundation", which stands against animal abuse. The Metal 4 Pets Foundation's goal is to unite the metal world to fight animal abuse.

He currently lives in Chicago and works as a locomotive engineer.

Discography

With Monarch 
All The World's Pain (full length, 2021, Independent/ Bloodblast Distribution)

With Soulfly 
Enslaved (full-length, 2012, Roadrunner Records)

With Borknagar 
Universal (full-length, 2010, Indie Recordings)
Urd (full-length, 2012, Century Media Records)

With Council of the Fallen 
Sever All Negatives (EP, 2006)

Endorsements 
 Pearl Drums Masterworks series drums & hardware
 Sabian Cymbals HH, AAX, AA, HHX
 Trick Drums U.S.A. Pro 1-V BigFoot single pedals
 Evans drum heads
 Vater drumsticks 17 1/4" .630 Hickory- David Kinkade signature)
 Ahead Spinal Glide throne, Ahead Armor cases

References 

1983 births
American heavy metal drummers
Death metal musicians
American black metal musicians
Living people
American locomotive engineers
Borknagar members
Soulfly members
Malevolent Creation members
21st-century American drummers
Schoolteachers from New Jersey